The 2011–12 Russian Professional Basketball League (PBL) was the second season of the Russian Professional League, and the 21st overall season of the Russian Professional Championship. CSKA Moscow won the title, by beating Khimki Moscow Region 2–0 in the league's playoff Finals.

Format 

Because of the involvement of the senior men's Russia national basketball team at the Olympic qualifying tournament in 2012, the 2011–12 Russian Professional League was reduced to two playoff series.

All teams met each other at home and away venues. In the regular season, each team played 18 games.

Teams

Regular season

Championship playoffs

Fifth position playoffs

Awards

Regular Season MVP
 Davon Jefferson (Triumph Lyubertsy)

Playoffs MVP
 Alexey Shved (CSKA Moscow)

All-Symbolic Team
First Symbolic Team
 Patrick Beverley (Spartak St. Petersburg)
 Zoran Planinić (Khimki Moscow Region)
 Davon Jefferson (Triumph Lyubertsy)
 Andrei Kirilenko (CSKA Moscow)
 Jeremiah Massey (Lokomotiv Kuban)
Second Symbolic Team
 Torey Thomas (Spartak Primorye)
 Vitaly Fridzon (Khimki Moscow Region)
 Sergey Karasev (Triumph Lyubertsy)
 Victor Khryapa (CSKA Moscow)
 Vladimir Veremeenko (UNICS Kazan)

See also
2011–12 VTB United League

References

External links 
 Professional Basketball League

Russian Professional Basketball League
2011–12 in Russian basketball
Russia